A body orifice is any opening in the body of an animal.

External
In a typical mammalian body such as the human body, the external body orifices are:

 The nostrils, for breathing and the associated sense of smell
 The mouth, for eating, breathing, and vocalizations such as speech
 The ear canals, for the sense of hearing 
 The nasolacrimal ducts, to carry tears from the lacrimal sac into the nasal cavity
 The anus, for defecation
 In males, the urinary meatus, for urination and ejaculation
 In females, the urinary meatus, for urination and female ejaculation
 In females, the vagina, for menstruation, sexual intercourse and childbirth
 The nipple orifices

Other animals may have some other body orifices:
cloaca, in birds, reptiles, amphibians, and some other animals
siphon in mollusk, arthropods, and some other animals

Internal
Internal orifices include the orifices of the outflow tracts of the heart, between the heart valves.

See also
Internal urethral orifice
Mucosa
Mucocutaneous boundary
Meatus
Body cavity

Anatomy